The Nevrorthidae (often incorrectly spelled "Neurorthidae") are a small family of winged insects of the order Neuroptera. Extant species may be described as living fossils. There are 19 extant species in four genera, with a geographically disjunct distribution: Nevrorthus, comprising 5 species with scattered distributions around the Mediterranean; Austroneurorthus, with two species known from southeastern Australia; Nipponeurorthus, comprising 11 species known from China and Japan; and Sinoneurorthus, known from a single species described from Yunnan Province, China. They are traditionally placed in the Osmyloidea, alongside Osmylidae and the spongillaflies (Sisyridae), but some research has considered them to be the sister group to the rest of Neuroptera. The larvae have unique straight jaws that are curved at the tips, and live as unspecialised predators in the sandy bottom sediments of clear, fast flowing mountain rivers and streams. They pupate underwater on the underside of stones. The adults are likely predators or feed on honeydew and other sugar-rich fluids.

Apart from the mere four living genera, several species are known from fossils, the oldest being a larvae from the Middle Jurassic of China, which already shows aquatic adaptations typical of modern nevorthid larvae.

Taxonomy
After

 Nevrorthus Costa, 1863
 Nevrorthus apatelios H. Aspöck, U. Aspöck & Hölzel, 1977 Balkans, Italy
 Nevrorthus fallax (Rambur, 1842) Sardinia and Corsica
 Nevrorthus hannibal U. Aspöck & H. Aspöck, 1983 Tunisia, Algeria
 Nevrorthus iridipennis Costa, 1863 Calabria, Sicily
 Nevrorthus reconditus Monserrat & Gavira, 2014 Malaga, Spain
 Genus Austroneurorthus Nakahara, 1958
 Austroneurorthus brunneipennis (Esben-Petersen, 1929) New South Wales, Queensland, Australia
 Austroneurorthus horstaspoecki U. Aspöck, 2004 Victoria, New South Wales, Australia
 Genus Nipponeurorthus Nakahara, 1958
 Nipponeurorthus damingshanicus Liu, H. Aspöck & U. Aspöck, 2014 Guangxi, China
 Nipponeurorthus fasciatus Nakahara, 1958 China (Taiwan)
 Nipponeurorthus flinti U. Aspöck & H. Aspöck, 2008 Japan (Okinawa, Amamioshima).
 Nipponeurorthus furcatus Liu, H. Aspöck & U. Aspöck, 2014 China (Yunnan)
 Nipponeurorthus fuscinervis (Nakahara, 1915) Japan (Hokkaido, Honshu)
 Nipponeurorthus multilineatus Nakahara, 1966 China (Taiwan).
 Nipponeurorthus pallidinervis Nakahara, 1958 Japan (Hokkaido, Honshu, Kyushu, Tsushima Island).
 Nipponeurorthus punctatus (Nakahara, 1915) Japan (Honshu, Hokkaido, Kyushu).
 Nipponeurorthus qinicus Yang in Chen, 1998 China (Shaanxi).
 Nipponeurorthus tianmushanus Yang & Gao, 2001 China (Zhejiang).
 Nipponeurorthus tinctipennis Nakahara, 1958 Japan (Yakushima Island).
 Genus Sinoneurorthus Liu, H. Aspöck & U. Aspöck, 2012
 Sinoneurorthus yunnanicus Liu, H. Aspöck & U. Aspöck, 2012, Yunnan, China

Extinct genera
 †Balticoneurorthus Wichard 2016 Baltic amber, Eocene
 †Cretarophalis Wichard 2017 Burmese amber, Myanmar, Late Cretaceous (Cenomanian)
 †Electroneurorthus Wichard et al. 2010 Baltic amber, Eocene 
 †Girafficervix Du, Niu & Bao, 2023 Daohugou Bed, China, Middle Jurassic
 †Palaeoneurorthus Wichard 2009 Baltic amber, Eocene
 †Rophalis Pictet 1854 Baltic amber, Rovno amber, Eocene

References

Neuroptera
Neuroptera families
Extant Middle Jurassic first appearances